Leslie Thomas Allen (7 March 1911 – 5 September 1989) was an Australian rules footballer who played with Carlton and North Melbourne in the Victorian Football League (VFL).

Family
The youngest child of Robert Allen and Agnes Louisa Maude Allen, née Madew, Leslie Thomas Allen was born at Wangaratta, Victoria, on 7 March 1911.

He married Mary Ursula "May" Tobrady on 21 September 1935.

Football
Allen, a forward, was originally from Wangaratta.

Fairfield (MAFA)
He came to Carlton via the Metropolitan Amateur Football Association (MAFA) team, Fairfield Football Club.

Carlton (VFL)
He kicked 8 goals haul in his second VFL game, against South Melbourne at Princes Park, in round four of the 1930 season. Despite playing from the forward-pocket, he continued to outscore his key forward teammates Horrie Clover and Harry Vallence for the rest of the year, and finished the season as Carlton's leading goal-kicker on 56 goals.

Although he kicked 15 goals in the opening three rounds of the 1931 season, he only kicked 16 goals in his remaining 10 senior games for that season. His overall record, while playing for Carlton was exactly three goals a game.

North Melbourne (VFL)
At the end of 1931, Allen, who had been unemployed for 18 months, transferred over to North Melbourne, and was immediately given employment (arranged by the North Melbourne committeeman, George Leslie Virgin).

Allen was second in the goal-kicking at North Melbourne to Tom Fitzmaurice in each of his three seasons, with a best of 44 goals in 1933.

At the end of the 1934 season he retired from the VFL, citing ill health. He attempted a comeback in 1937, without success.

Brunswick (VFA)
Identified as a forward from Fairfield, Allen took part in the 1939 pre-season training at Brunswick, and made the club's final training list for the season.
"Les Allen (Fairfield and Carlton) should prove an acquisition on [Brunswick's] forward line. He co-operated well with the more seasoned players, and, although he has had no previous experience of the throw-pass, proved himself an excellent pupil."  — The Sporting Globe, 1 April 1939.

His only senior game for Brunswick was when he was 19th man in the 29 April 1939 match against Northcote; he replaced the injured Bill McGrath during the third quarter.

Fairfield (VAFA)
In 1939 he was granted a clearance from Brunswick to the Fairfield Football Club in the Victorian Amateur Football Association (VAFA), the D Section premiers in 1938.

Death
He died at Wangaratta on 5 September 1989.

Notes

References

External links

 
 Les Allen, at The VFA Project
 Les Allen, at Blueseum

1911 births
1989 deaths
Australian rules footballers from Victoria (Australia)
Carlton Football Club players
North Melbourne Football Club players
Brunswick Football Club players